Didlington is a village in the Breckland district of mid-Norfolk, East Anglia, England in the United Kingdom. At the 2011 Census the minimal population was included in the civil parish of Ickburgh.

The villages name possibly means 'farm/settlement of Duddel's people' or perhaps, 'farm/settlement connected with Duddel'.

The village is served by St Michael's Church in the Benefice of Cockley Cley.

Didlington Hall was a country house, which at one point housed the Egyptological collections of William Tyssen-Amherst, 1st Baron Amherst of Hackney. Apart from the stables and a clock tower, it was demolished in the 1950s. A new house was built on the site in 2007.

References

http://kepn.nottingham.ac.uk/map/place/Norfolk/Didlington

Villages in Norfolk
Civil parishes in Norfolk
Breckland District